Polk County Historical Museum may refer to:
Polk County Historical Museum (Florida) in Bartow
Polk County Historical Museum (Wisconsin) in Balsam Lake